"Carry On" is a song by American indie pop band fun. It was released on October 23, 2012 as the third single off their second album, Some Nights. The song was written by the band members, Nate Ruess, Andrew Dost, Jack Antonoff, alongside the album's producer, Jeff Bhasker.

Composition
"Carry On" has been called "a song about perseverance in hard times", which is supported by a rock-anthem sound written in F major and composed in 12/8 time. The song begins with Ruess singing with faint vocals, as he confronts a potential suicide. Ruess's quiet vocals are eventually reinforced by a large chorus and band member Jack Antonoff's guitar-playing. The narrator takes refuge in a bar alongside his friends, who begin to contemplate the mortality of the people close to them. Antonoff delivers a short, 20-second "Slash-type wailing" guitar solo, which appears over two and a half minutes into the song.

Live performances
On 3 November 2012, the band was the musical guest on Saturday Night Live, with Louis C.K. as host, and performed this song, alongside "Some Nights". They also performed the song at the 2013 Grammy Awards.

In media
It is also featured in the HGTV 2013 #LoveHome commercial and in the pilot episode of FX series Legit. The song is also featured in the 2013 documentary Bridegroom and the Portuguese telenovela Destinos Cruzados (2013/14). A shortened version is performed in the second season of Zoey's Extraordinary Playlist (2021).

Charts
"Carry On" was released on 23 October 2012 as the third single off their second album, Some Nights. "Carry On" is their third consecutive single to reach the top 20 on the Billboard Hot 100. It debuted at #100 on that chart and in the subsequent weeks climbed until peaking at #20.  It has sold over a million downloads as of April 2013.

Weekly charts

Year-end charts

Certifications

References 

Fun (band) songs
2012 songs
2012 singles
Song recordings produced by Jeff Bhasker
Songs written by Jeff Bhasker
Songs written by Jack Antonoff
Music videos directed by Anthony Mandler
Fueled by Ramen singles
Pop ballads
Rock ballads
Songs written by Andrew Dost
Songs written by Nate Ruess
2010s ballads
Songs about suicide